Risto Sakari Alapuro (28 April 1944 – 6 December 2022) was a Finnish sociologist.

Alapuro was born in Ruokolahti on 28 April 1944.

Alapuro was a professor of sociology at University of Jyväskylä between 1986 and 1991, and a professor at Helsinki University from 1991 to 2010.

Alapuro was an internationally known social scientist who focused on historical sociology in Finland. He researched, studied and taught in France, Russia and the United States. He specialized in social movements, political conflicts and social networks.

Alapuro wrote his doctoral dissertation Akateeminen Karjala-Seura (in 1973). His other works include State and revolution in Finland (1988), which concerns the Finnish civil war, and Suomen synty paikallisena ilmiönä 1890-1933 (1994), which is about the birth of Finnish nationhood as a local phenomenon.

Alapuro died in Helsinki on 6 December 2022, at the age of 78.

References

Sources
 Alapuro, Risto at Uppslagsverket Finland (2003)

Notes

1944 births
2022 deaths
People from Ruokolahti
Finnish sociologists
20th-century Finnish historians
Academic staff of the University of Jyväskylä
Members of Academia Europaea
Members of the Finnish Academy of Science and Letters
Academic staff of the University of Helsinki